One Broadway is a residential skyscraper in the city of Miami, Florida, United States. It is located in Downtown's southern Brickell Financial District, an area of increased density with the recent building boom in Miami. The 42-story tower was completed in 2005, and is located at 1451 South Miami Avenue, two blocks west of Brickell Avenue. The building is near Southeast/Southwest 15th Road, which is known as Broadway in Brickell. The building was closed in the early 2020s for more than a year for a major renovation, including a new glass façade.

See also
List of tallest buildings in Miami

References

http://www.rileagroup.com/projects1.htm

http://www.emporis.com/application/?nav=building&lng=3&id=176655

Residential buildings completed in 2005
Residential skyscrapers in Miami
2005 establishments in Florida